Priborovoye is a rural locality (a selo) in Vostrovsky Selsoviet, Volchikhinsky District, Altai Krai, Russia. The population was 372 as of 2013. It was founded in 1994. There are 3 streets.

Geography 
Priborovoye is located 26 km northeast of Volchikha (the district's administrative centre) by road. Vostrovo is the nearest rural locality.

References 

Rural localities in Volchikhinsky District